Edmund Lyons  may refer to:
 Edmund Lyons, 1st Baron Lyons (1790–1858), British naval commander and diplomat
Edmund Moubray Lyons, British naval commander, son of the Baron

See also
Edward Lyons (disambiguation)
Lyons (surname)